'''Jihan or jihane

Jihan
 Jihan Malla, Lebanese television personality and voice actress
 Jihan El-Tahri, Egyptian writer
 Jihan Wali, Guantanamo detainee
 Jihan Wu, Chinese cryptocurrency entrepreneur and billionaire
 Jihan Zencirli (born 1985), Turkish-American conceptual artist and sculpture artist
 Jihan (born 2004), stage name of Han Ji-hyo from K-Pop group Weeekly

Jihane
 Jihane Almira Chedid (born 2000), Indonesian People's Consultative Assembly Ambassador, actress, fashion model and beauty pageant titleholder 
 Jihane Samlal (born 1983), Moroccan slalom canoer

See also
 Eve Jihan Jeffers Cooper, birth name of an American rapper, singer, songwriter, and actress Eve (born 1978)